Teniorhinus niger is a butterfly in the family Hesperiidae first described by Hamilton Herbert Druce in 1910. It is found in Cameroon, Gabon, the Democratic Republic of the Congo and western Uganda.

References

Butterflies described in 1910
Erionotini